Quartararo is a surname. Notable people with the surname include:

 Fabio Quartararo (born 1999), French motorcycle rider
 Phil Quartararo (born 1956), American music industry executive
 Riccardo Quartararo (1443–1506), Italian painter of the Renaissance period

See also 
 Alex Quartararo, a fictional character in Battlestar Galactica